Alexander Dmitrievich Litovchenko (1835, Kremenchuk - 28 June 1890, Saint Petersburg) was a Russian painter who specialized in depicting Muscovite Russia of the 16th and 17th centuries.

Biography
Litovchenko attended the Imperial Academy of Arts and, although criticised by his peers for rather stilted compositions, was awarded a lesser gold medal for his rendering of Charon transporting the souls of the dead across the Styx. Along with several other young painters, he challenged the spirit of academism that was prevalent at the Academy and in 1863 left it to become a freelance painter, joining the Peredvizhniki movement in 1876.

In 1868, Litovchenko was recognized as an academician for his picture of a falconer serving at the court of Tsar Alexis (one of his several versions of the subject). Among his larger paintings, Ivan the Terrible Showing His Treasures to Jerome Horsey (1875) was purchased by the Tsar for the Alexander III Museum in St. Petersburg, and Tsar Alexis and Archbishop Nikon Venerating the Relics of Patriarch Philip (1886) was acquired by Pavel Tretyakov for his collection in Moscow (as were the finest of his portraits).

Litovchenko is also remembered as the author of seven murals in the Cathedral of Christ the Saviour in Moscow and a set of icons for the Crimean War memorial in Sevastopol.

References

External links

1835 births
1890 deaths
People from Kremenchuk
People from Poltava Governorate
19th-century painters from the Russian Empire
Russian male painters
Russian people of Ukrainian descent
Ukrainian painters
Ukrainian male painters
History painters
Peredvizhniki
19th-century male artists from the Russian Empire